In Hindu mythology, Lokaloka is an enormous mountain belt believed to be ten thousand yojanas in breadth, and as many in height. Its name means "a world and no world". It features in Puranic cosmography as the dividing line between the known world, consisting of seven concentric island continents or dvipas and seven encircling oceans, and the dark void of nothingness.

References

Locations in Hindu mythology
Hindu cosmology